Joseph Bernhard Mark Mobius (born August 17, 1936) is an American-born German emerging markets fund manager and founder of Mobius Capital Partners LLP.

Early life and education 
Joseph Bernhard Mark Mobius was born to German and Puerto Rican parents in Hempstead, New York. He earned his B.A. and M.S. in Communications from Boston University, and received a Ph.D in economics from Massachusetts Institute of Technology in 1964. He also studied at the University of Wisconsin, University of New Mexico, and Kyoto University in Japan.

Career 
Mobius was executive chairman of Templeton Emerging Markets Group, having joined Templeton in 1987. At Templeton, he established and directed the research team based in 18 global emerging markets offices and managed more than $50 billion in emerging markets portfolios. In 2015, after leading the company for over a quarter of a century, Mark Mobius decided to step down as the lead manager of the Templeton Emerging Markets Investment Trust (TEMIT) and handed over control of the fund to Carlos Hardenberg. In 2018, Franklin Templeton announced Mobius' retirement from Franklin Templeton effective January 31, 2018. In March 2018, Mobius launched Mobius Capital Partners together with his former Templeton colleagues Carlos von Hardenberg and Greg Konieczny. The emerging and frontier markets asset manager is focused on a single long-only strategy based on actively partnering with portfolio companies to improve their corporate governance and to deliver a clear ESG pathway.

Before joining Templeton, Mobius worked at international securities firm Vickers-da-Costa, and later was president of International Investment Trust Company in Taipei, Taiwan. He once ran an independent consulting company that marketed, among other things, Snoopy cartoon merchandise.

Born a U.S. citizen, Mobius was also entitled to German citizenship by descent. He renounced his U.S. citizenship and is now a German citizen.

Mobius has stated his preference for a Donald Trump victory in the 2020 United States Presidential election and called a potential win by the Biden-Harris ticket "disastrous" for the stock market and economy.

On March 2, 2023, Mobius told Fox Business in an interview that he cannot take his money out of China due to the country's capital controls. He also said that he would be "very, very careful" investing in the country. "The bottom line is that China is moving in a completely different direction than what Deng Xiaoping instituted when they started the big reform program," he said.  On March 7, according to Bloomberg News, Mobius told Ming Pao that the issue "seems to have resolved".

Industry recognition 
Mobius has been a key figure in developing international policy for emerging markets. In 1999, he was selected to serve on the World Bank's Global Corporate Governance Forum as a member of the Private Sector Advisory Group and as co-chair of the Investor Responsibility Taskforce. He has also been featured as a speaker for the World Bank in 1999 and has given seminars for many other groups, including for the Asian Development Bank in 2002 and as a motivational speaker for London Speaker Bureau.

As a recognized industry expert, Mobius appears frequently on financial industry television shows and networks, including Bloomberg, CNBC, MSNBC, and CNN, and has given/written thousands of interviews and opinion pieces over the years.

After more than 40 years in global emerging markets, Mobius has received numerous industry awards, including being named one of Bloomberg Markets Magazine's "50 Most Influential People" in 2011, "Emerging Markets Equity Manager of the Year 2001" by International Money Marketing, "Ten Top Money Managers of the 20th Century" in a 1999 Carson Group survey, "Number One Global Emerging Market Fund" in a 1998 Reuters Survey, "1994 First in Business Money Manager of the Year" by CNBC, "Closed-End Fund Manager of the Year" in 1993 by Morningstar, and "Investment Trust Manager of the Year 1992" by the Sunday Telegraph.

Mobius has also been given various humorous nicknames over the years, including the "Pied Piper of emerging markets", the "dean of emerging markets", a world "globetrotter", and the Yul Brynner of Wall Street due to his signature bald head look.

Mobius is also a regular monthly columnist for the Asia Tatler group of magazines, wherein he authors a column on "Wealth".

A comic book on the life of Mark Mobius was published in 2007: "Mark Mobius — An Illustrated Biography of the Father of Emerging Markets Funds" is currently translated into six languages (English, Traditional Chinese, Korean, Indonesian, Thai and Japanese) and available in numerous countries.

Mobius appears in Erwin Wagenhofer's documentary "Let's Make Money" (2008), where he frankly details his thoughts on financial markets and capitalism.

Selected publications 

Mobius has written several books, including "Trading with China," "The Investor's Guide to Emerging Markets," "Mobius on Emerging Markets," "Passport to Profits," "Equities—An Introduction to the Core Concepts," "Mutual Funds—An Introduction to the Core Concepts," "The Little Book of Emerging Markets," and "Mark Mobius: An Illustrated Biography." He writes regularly about his travels on his personal website: markmobius.com.

 Invest for Good - A Healthier World and a Wealthier You (with Carlos von Hardenberg and Greg Konieczny), 2019. 
 Debt Markets (Mark Mobius Financial Insights), 2008. 
 Risk Management (Mark Mobius Financial Insights), 2008. 
 Derivatives (Mark Mobius Financial Insights), 2008. 
 Foreign Exchange and Money Markets (Mark Mobius Masterclass), 2007. 
 Technical Analysis: An Introduction To The Core Concepts, 2007. 
 Mutual Funds: An Introduction To The Core Concepts, 2007. 
 Equities: An Introduction To The Core Concepts, 2006. 
 Passport to Profits, 1999. 
 Mobius on Emerging Markets, 1996. 
 The Investor's Guide to Emerging Markets, 1994. 
 Trading With China, 1973.

References

External links 
 Notes from Mark Mobius Templeton Blog 2009
 PBS In-depth interview Philosophy of emerging markets. May 2001.
 Franklin Templeton Global Perspectives. Overview on Emerging Markets, March 2008
 BBC interview Investing in emerging markets, June 2008
 Investors Chronicle interview Mark Mobius tips Turkey, S. Africa, July 2008
 Podcast: Mark Mobius Ten top investment tips, June 2009

American investors
People from Hempstead (village), New York
American money managers
Living people
MIT School of Humanities, Arts, and Social Sciences alumni
Former United States citizens
1936 births
American people of Puerto Rican descent
German people of Puerto Rican descent
20th-century American businesspeople
20th-century German businesspeople
21st-century German businesspeople
German investors
German money managers
Boston University alumni
Businesspeople from New York (state)